Jan Thomas Njerve (7 June 1927 – 17 November 2014) was a Norwegian painter.

He was born in Eidanger, and was married to opera singer Kari Frisell. He attended the Norwegian National Academy of Fine Arts from 1946 to 1948, and also trained abroad. He is known as a landscape painter, among others with the work Spansk landskap (1960) owned by the National Gallery of Norway, and as a portrait painter, among others of Olav V of Norway and Harald V of Norway.

References

1927 births
2014 deaths
People from Porsgrunn
Oslo National Academy of the Arts alumni
20th-century Norwegian painters
21st-century Norwegian painters
Norwegian male painters
Norwegian landscape painters
Norwegian portrait painters
20th-century Norwegian male artists
21st-century Norwegian male artists